Magda Genuin (born 17 June 1979 in Agordo) is an Italian cross-country skier who compteded from 1997 to 2011.

Biography
She finished sixth in the 4 × 5 km relay at the 2007 FIS Nordic World Ski Championships in Sapporo and earned her best individual finish of 12th in the 10 km event at those same championships.

Genuin's best individual finish at the Winter Olympics was fifth in individual sprint at Vancouver in 2010.

She has a total of eight individual victories at various levels at various distances up to 10 km since 2000. Genuin's best individual World Cup finish was second in Rybinsk in 2010.

Cross-country skiing results
All results are sourced from the International Ski Federation (FIS).

Olympic Games

World Championships

World Cup

Season standings

Individual podiums

5 podiums – (4 , 1 )

Team podiums

 4 victories – (1 , 3 ) 
 7 podiums – (3 , 4 )

Italian Championships
 2002: 1st, Italian women's championships of cross-country skiing, sprint
 2003: 3rd, Italian women's championships of cross-country skiing, sprint
 2004: 2nd, Italian women's championships of cross-country skiing, 5 km
 2005: 
 2nd, Italian women's championships of cross-country skiing, 7.5 km free
 3rnd, Italian women's championships of cross-country skiing, 7.5 km classic
 2007:
 2nd, Italian women's championships of cross-country skiing, 10 km
 2nd, Italian women's championships of cross-country skiing, sprint
 2009: 1st, Italian women's championships of cross-country skiing, sprint
 2010:
 1st, Italian women's championships of cross-country skiing, sprint
 3rd, Italian women's championships of cross-country skiing, 10 km
 2011:
 1st, Italian women's championships of cross-country skiing, sprint
 2nd, Italian women's championships of cross-country skiing, 2 × 7.5 km pursuit
 3rd, Italian women's championships of cross-country skiing, 5 km

References

External links

1979 births
Cross-country skiers at the 2002 Winter Olympics
Cross-country skiers at the 2006 Winter Olympics
Cross-country skiers at the 2010 Winter Olympics
Italian female cross-country skiers
Living people
Olympic cross-country skiers of Italy
Cross-country skiers of Gruppo Sportivo Esercito